Zəyəm or Zagyam or Dzagam or Dzagem or Zeyam may refer to:
Zəyəm Cırdaxan, Azerbaijan
Zəyəm, Qakh, Azerbaijan
Zəyəm, Shamkir, Azerbaijan
Zəyəm, Zaqatala, Azerbaijan